"Shiver 'n' Shake" is a song recorded by Canadian country music artist Rick Tippe. It was released in 1999 as the second single from his third studio album, Shiver 'n' Shake. It peaked at number 10 on the RPM Country Tracks chart in October 1999.

Chart performance

Year-end charts

References

1999 songs
1999 singles
Rick Tippe songs
Music videos directed by Stephano Barberis